Corymbia pocillum is a species of tree that is endemic to a small area in Queensland. It has rough flaky bark on the trunk, sometimes also on the larger branches, smooth bark above, lance-shaped adult leaves, flower buds in groups of seven, white flowers and urn-shaped to almost spherical fruit.

Description
Flowering occurs between April and July and the flowers are white.

Taxonomy and naming
Corymbia pocillum was first formally described in 1987 by Denis John Carr and Stella Grace Maisie Carr who gave it the name Eucalyptus pocillum and published the description in their book Eucalyptus II - The rubber cuticle, and other studies of the Corymbosae. They collected the type specimens between Georgetown and Normanton in 1971. In 1995, Ken Hill and Lawrie Johnson changed the name to Corymbia pocillum, publishing the change in the journal Telopea. The specific epithet (pocillum) is a Latin noun meaning "a little cup".

Distribution and habitat
This eucalypt grows in sandy soil on sandstone and granite around Normanton and south of there towards Hughenden.

Conservation status
This species is listed as of "least concern" under the Queensland Government Nature Conservation Act 1992.

See also
 List of Corymbia species

References

pocillum
Myrtales of Australia
Flora of Queensland
Plants described in 1987
Taxa named by Maisie Carr